Blue Wave is a file-based offline mail reader that was popular among bulletin board system users, especially users of FidoNet and other networks that generated large volumes of mail. It allowed users to download all of their mail and messages, read and edit them offline, and then upload any replies. This reduced the amount of time they spent on line. The name "Blue Wave" originally referred to the client software, but as new clients were written that supported the same file format, the name came to refer primarily to the format itself.

History
Blue Wave developed after Fred Rappuhn and George Hatchew met at a picnic arranged for local area sysops. The two developed the concept at the picnic and started development immediately. Rappuhn concentrated on the offline reader, while Hatchew concentrated on the BBS door program that would convert the BBS message system to a Blue Wave format. The first version was released to the public 20 September 1990, marketed via their company, Blue Wave Software. Doors for most PC BBS systems were made available over time.

Another offline mail packet format called QWK was created in 1987, but only ran on the commercial PCBoard system. It remained less widely used than Blue Wave until new QWK doors appeared covering many of the same BBS systems. The Blue Wave client software was then adapted to allow it to read and write QWK as well as Blue Wave files.  

Rappuhn was hired as a programmer by Electronic Data Systems (EDS) in September 1991 and was unable to continue development for Blue Wave Software.  Blue Wave Software dissolved and Hatchew started Cutting Edge Computing to continue development. Hatchew was later involved in a serious car accident, and was unable to continue development of the system past 1993.

Description
Like QWK, Blue Wave message files consisted of a selection of seemingly randomly named files. Messages themselves were stored in the main .DAT file, supported by an information file and a file containing the headers for each message, and a pointer to the body in the DAT.

The Blue Wave packet format has also been supported by other offline mail readers such as BlueMail, MultiMail, and Wolverine. A tool called bwave2mbox is also available to convert Blue Wave packets to mbox files.

Y2K
The Y2K date problem hit Blue Wave, like so many other programs. The Blue Wave Reader that the end users use to read their mail exhibited the problem by the addition of a numerical digit leading the TO: name in the header. The Blue Wave Door on the BBS' exhibited the problem by creating three digit years where there should have been a two digit year. Several fixes not directly related to Blue Wave were created but they worked on the actual messages after they had been imported into the local message bases.

In October 1999, Dale Shipp created a fix called BWREPFIX that corrects the problem on the users end. This solution uses a batch file in the archiver section rather than calling the archiver directly. In the batch file, the outbound message dates are fixed and then the batch file calls the archiver which then packs the messages for transmitting to the BBS.

Another Y2K fix was created and released in October 2005. This fix is a patch to the binary date library provided by the Borland International C++ libraries that the Blue Wave Door and Reader programs are compiled with. This fix is considered to be a cleaner solution to the problem because the actual library is repaired internally which means that this method doesn't require any external tools to perform the fixing of the dates.

See also
QWK (file format)
SOUP (file format)
ZipNews

References

External links

Bulletin board systems
Offline mail readers